Robert Shafto may refer to:

Robert Shafto (1690–1729), English politician, Member of Parliament (MP) for the City of Durham 1712–1713, 1727–1730
Bobby Shafto (1732–1797), English MP for Durham 1760–1768, and for Downton 1780–1790
Robert Eden Duncombe Shafto (1776–1848), MP for the City of Durham 1804–1806
Robert Duncombe Shafto (1796–1888), English politician, MP for North Durham 1847–1888

See also
Robert "Bobby" Shaftoe, protagonist of Neal Stephenson's novel Cryptonomicon